The New Union (Social Liberals) (NS) was a social-liberal political party in Lithuania. The NS was a member of the European Liberal Democrat and Reform Party (ELDR) and an observer of the Liberal International. It was founded in 1998 and is led by Artūras Paulauskas.

History

Establishment and participation in government (1998–2006) 
The party was formed in 1998 on a basis of Artūras Paulauskas presidential campaign team.

Its policy was based on social liberalism: the principal values of which are personal freedom, social solidarity, welfare of people and justice.

In 2000 municipal elections the party won the most seats in municipalities districts' councils.

In 2000 it formed a coalition government with the Liberal Union (and Lithuanian Centre Union and Modern Christian Democrats), but after disagreements between two, in 2001 a new coalition with the Lithuanian Social Democratic Party (LSDP) was formed.

Its candidate Vilija Blinkevičiūtė won 16.6% of the votes in the 2004 presidential election.  At that year's parliamentary election, the party ran in alliance with the Social Democratic Party (LSDP) under the label 'Coalition of Algirdas Brazauskas and Artūras Paulauskas: Working for Lithuania'.  The list won 31 seats out of 141, of which the New Union won 11. After these election a coalition with the LSDP, the Labour Party and Lithuanian Popular Peasant Union (LVLS), which lasted up until summer of 2006.

In opposition, in government and dissolution (2006–2011) 

In January 2008 the party joined new coalition, which consisted from the LSDP, the LVLS, Civic Democratic Party and Liberal and Centre Union.

At the 2008 parliamentary election, the party lost heavily, winning only 1 seat in the Seimas and only 3.64% of the national vote. As other parties that were part of coalition governments in the outgoing parliament suffered in the elections (Social Democratic Party of Lithuania, Labour Party, Liberal and Centre Union and Lithuanian Peasant Popular Union), all lost seats in the Seimas and in the new parliament a centre-right coalition under Andrius Kubilius had the most seats. It left the New Union in opposition.

The party's one member in the Seimas, Valerijus Simulik, sat with the Social Democratic Party political group. In 2011, the party merged with the Labour Party. A minority faction switched to the Liberal and Centre Union.

See also
 Liberalism in Lithuania

References

External links
 (Social Liberals) Official site, archived as for November, 2003

Defunct liberal political parties
Defunct political parties in Lithuania
Liberal parties in Lithuania
Social liberal parties
Political parties established in 1998
Political parties disestablished in 2011
1998 establishments in Lithuania